St. James Lutheran Church, also known as Straw Church, is a historic church built in 1834 and located at 1213 U.S. Route 22 in Pohatcong Township, Warren County, New Jersey. St. James Lutheran Cemetery is located across the street in Greenwich Township. The church and cemetery were added as a historic district to the National Register of Historic Places on October 24, 2016 for their significance in architecture and exploration/settlement. The adjoining building, Fellowship Hall, and the schoolhouse by the cemetery entrance are not part of this listing. The one-room brick schoolhouse, built 1858, is listed separately on the state register.

History
The congregation was founded  as a union church of German Lutheran and German Reformed Protestant settlers. By tradition, the first church was called Straw Church, a log building with a straw thatched roof, built  in the cemetery area. Christian Streit preached here and at the nearby Lutheran church in Easton, Pennsylvania. The second church was built with stone starting in June 1790. The third church, the current building, was built with brick and has a cornerstone dated May 1, 1834.

The first regular, resident pastor, starting in 1769, was John Peter Gabriel Muhlenberg, eldest son of Henry Melchior Muhlenberg, considered the patriarch of American Lutheranism.

The cemetery is fronted by a low limestone wall with the date June 1790 engraved in a stone by the gateway. The earliest identified headstone is a brown sandstone, dated 1771, for the child David Metz. The obverse of the headstone for Peter Heintz, dated 1777, features a tree of life motif, carved by an anonymous German craftsman from Northampton County, Pennsylvania.

Description
The church is a brick building designed with Federal architecture style and featuring Flemish bond on the front. The wooden cupola was added in 1960. It is the third church building at this location.

Gallery

See also
 German Palatines
 List of Lutheran churches in the United States

References

External links
 
 

Pohatcong Township, New Jersey
Greenwich Township, Warren County, New Jersey
Lutheran churches in New Jersey
Churches on the National Register of Historic Places in New Jersey
Cemeteries on the National Register of Historic Places in New Jersey
Churches completed in 1834
1834 establishments in New Jersey
Churches in Warren County, New Jersey
National Register of Historic Places in Warren County, New Jersey
New Jersey Register of Historic Places
Brick buildings and structures
Religious organizations established in 1760
1760 establishments in New Jersey
Federal architecture in New Jersey